Arhopala myrzala is a butterfly in the family Lycaenidae. It was described by William Chapman Hewitson in 1869. It is  found  in the Indomalayan realm.

Subspecies
A. m. myrzala (Philippines: Mindanao)
A. m. conjuncta Corbet, 1941 (Langkawi)
A. m. lammas Corbet, 1941 (Peninsular Malaysia, Singapore, Borneo)

References

External links
 Arhopala at Markku Savela's Lepidoptera and Some Other Life Forms

Arhopala
Butterflies described in 1869
Butterflies of Asia
Taxa named by William Chapman Hewitson